Lin Mingxian (also known as Sai Lin or Sai Leun; born Lin Mingxian in 1945) is the chairman of the National Democratic Alliance Army (NDAA) and the leader of the Shan State Special region 4.

Biography
Lin is an ethnic Chinese, and was born in 1945 in Hainan, China. During the Cultural Revolution in 1960s, he moved Yunnan into Burma and then joined to help strengthen the Communist Party of Burma (CPB), has until now enjoyed considerable economic success in Mong La. He became a field commander in CPB zone 815, or present-day Mong La.

When the Party disintegrated after the Wa rank-and-file revolted against its leadership in 1989, he headed one of the largest breakaway factions, the National Democratic Alliance Army. He was one of the several ex-CPB commanders to sign a ceasefire with the government in Rangoon, allowing the former communist the opportunity to create his own fiefdom centred first on the opium trade and then gambling as Special Region 4 became “opium free” in 1997.

To placate Lin and guarantee he would not take up arms again, Burmese authorities granted him generous terms. Mong La became an autonomous zone and his well-equipped private army of several thousand men retained its arms. Additionally, he was given several business concessions: the tacit permission for the opium trade being the most lucrative. As the billboard commemorates, Khin Nyunt flew in to seal the pact with a shady handshake. Soon new refineries in his area went into operation. By the early-1990s Lin headed one of the most powerful drug syndicates in northern Burma with an output of one to two thousand kilogrammes of pure heroin annually. For years he was high on the hitlist of the US State Department.

Lin made a few abortive attempts to develop traditional business interests in the city. He invested some $US4 million in a sugar mill outside Mong La, only to find that no market existed for the sugar. A similar attempt to cultivate new varieties of rice also faltered when he failed to attract Chinese buyers. Lin’s construction business, Asia Wealth Company, has built a new sealed road that links Sop Lwe to the outside world.

Lin is married to Nang Yin, the eldest daughter of Pheung Kya-shin, the chairman of the Kokang Special Region in Myanmar and the leader of the Myanmar National Democratic Alliance Army (MNDAA).

See also
 National Democratic Alliance Army
 Shan State Special region 4

References

1945 births
Burmese people of Chinese descent
Living people
Burmese warlords
People from Hainan
Politicians from Hainan